This is a list of state leaders in the 18th century (1701–1800) AD, of the Holy Roman Empire.

Main

Holy Roman Empire, Kingdom of Germany
Emperors Elect, Kings –
Leopold I, Emperor Elect, King (1658–1705)
Joseph I, Emperor Elect (1705–1711), King (1690–1711)
Charles VI, Emperor Elect, King (1711–1740)
Charles VII, Emperor Elect, King (1742–1745)
Francis I, Emperor Elect (1745–1765), King (1745–1764)
Joseph II, Emperor Elect (1765–1790), King (1764–1790)
Leopold II, Emperor Elect, King (1790–1792)
Francis II, Emperor Elect, King (1792–1806)
 –
Dominik Andreas I. von Kaunitz, Vice Chancellor (1698–1705)
Friedrich Karl von Schönborn-Buchheim, Vice Chancellor (1705–1734)
Johann Adolf Graf von Metsch, Vice Chancellor (1734–1740)
Johann Georg Graf von Königsfeld, Vice Chancellor (1742–1745)
Rudolph Joseph von Colloredo, Vice Chancellor (1745–1788)
Franz de Paula Gundaker von Colloredo, Vice Chancellor (1789–1806)

Austrian

Archduchy of Austria (complete list) –
Leopold VI, Archduke (1657, 1665–1705)
Joseph I, Archduke (1705–1711)
Charles III, Archduke (1711–1740)
Maria Theresa, Archduchess (1740–1780)
Francis I Stephen, Archduke (1740–1765)
Joseph II, Archduke (1765–1790)
Leopold VII, Archduke (1790–1792)
Francis II, Archduke (1792–1804), Emperor (1804–1835)

Principality of Auersperg (complete list) –
Johann Ferdinand, Prince (1677–1705)
Franz Karl, Prince (1705–1713)
Heinrich Joseph Johann, Prince (1713–1783)
Karl Josef, Prince (1783–1800)
Wilhelm I, Prince (1800–1806)

Prince-Bishopric of Brixen (complete list) –
, Prince-bishop (1685–1702)
, Prince-bishop (1702–1747)
, Prince-bishop (1747–1778)
, Prince-bishop (1779–1779)
, Prince-bishop (1779–1791)
Karl Franz Lodron, Prince-bishop (1791–1803)

Prince-Bishopric of Chur (complete list) –
Ulrich VII. Freiherr von Federspiel, Prince-bishop (1692–1728)
Joseph Benedikt Freiherr von Rost, Prince-bishop (1728–1754)
Johannes Baptist Anton Freiherr von Federspiel, Prince-bishop (1755–1777)
Franz Dionys von Rost, Prince-bishop (1777–1793)
Karl Rudolf Graf von Buol-Schauenstein, Prince-bishop (1794–1803)

Fürstenberg-Fürstenberg (complete list) –
Joseph Wilhelm Ernst, Count (1704–1716), Prince (1716–1762)
Joseph Wenceslaus, Prince (1762–1783)
Joseph Maria Benedict, Prince (1783–1796)
Charles Joachim, Prince (1796–1804)

Principality of Heitersheim (complete list) –
, Prince-prior (1683–1704)
, Prince-prior (1704–1721)
, Prince-prior (1721–1727)
, Prince-prior (1728–1752)
, Prince-prior (1754–1754)
, Prince-prior (1755–1775)
, Prince-prior (1775–1777)
, Prince-prior (1777–1796)
Ignaz Balthasar Rinck von Baldenstein, Prince-prior (1796–1806)

Principality of Liechtenstein (complete list) –
Hans-Adam I, Prince (1684–1712)
Josef Wenzel I, Prince (1712–1718)
Anton Florian, Prince (1718–1721)
Josef Johann Adam, Prince (1721–1732)
Johann Nepomuk Karl, Prince (1732–1748)
Josef Wenzel I, Prince (1748–1772)
Franz Josef I, Prince (1772–1781)
Aloys I, Prince (1781–1805)

Prince-Bishopric of Trent (complete list) –
Johann Michael Graf von Spaur, Prince-bishop (1696–1725)
Giovanni Benedetto Gentilotti, Prince-bishop (1725–1725)
Anton Dominik Graf von Wolkenstein, Prince-bishop (1725–1730)
Dominik Anton Graf von Thun, Prince-bishop (1730–1758)
Leopold Ernst von Firmian, Administrator (1748–1758)
Francesco Felice Alberti di Enno, Prince-bishop (1758–1762)
Cristoforo Francesco Sizzo de Norris, Prince-bishop (1763–1776)
Peter Michael Vigil Graf von Thun und Hohenstein, Prince-bishop (1776–1800)
Emmanuel Maria Graf von Thun und Hohenstein, Prince-bishop (1800–1802), Prince (1802–1803)

Bavarian

Electorate of Bavaria (complete list) –
Maximilian II Emanuel, Elector (1679–1726)
Charles Albert, Elector (1726–1745)
Maximilian III Joseph, Elector (1745–1777)
Charles Theodore, Elector (1777–1799)
Maximillian IV, Elector (1799–1805), King (1805–1825)

Berchtesgaden Prince-Provostry (complete list) –
Joseph Clemens of Bavaria, Prince-provost (1688–1723)
Julius Heinrich von Rehlingen-Radau, Prince-provost (1723–1732)
Cajetan Anton von Notthaft, Prince-provost (1732–1752)
Michael Balthasar von Christalnigg, Prince-provost (1752–1768)
Franz Anton Joseph von Hausen-Gleichenstorff, Prince-provost (1768–1780)
Joseph Konrad von Schroffenberg-Mös, Prince-provost (1780–1803)

Saint Emmeram's Abbey (complete list) –
Anselm Godin de Tampezo, Prince-Abbot (1731–1742)
Johann V Baptist Kraus, Prince-Abbot (1742–1762)
Frobenius Forster, Prince-Abbot (1762–1791)
Coelestin II Steiglehner, Prince-Abbot (1791–1803)

Prince-Bishopric of Freising (complete list) –
John Francis Eckher of Kapfing and Liechteneck, Prince-bishop (1694/95–1727)
Johann Theodor of Bavaria, Prince-bishop (1727–1763)
Clemens Wenceslaus, Prince-bishop (1763–1768)
Louis Joseph of Welden, Prince-bishop (1768–1788)
Maximilian Prokop of Toerring-Jettenbach, Prince-bishop (1788–1789)
Joseph Conrad Freiherr, Prince-bishop (1790–1802)

Prince-Abbey of Niedermünster (complete list) –
Johanna Franziska Sibylla von Muggenthal, Abbess (1697–1723)
Maria Katharina Helena von Aham-Neuhaus, Abbess (1723–1757)
Anna Katharina von Dücker-Hasslen-Urstein-Winkel, Abbess (1757–1768)
Anna Febronia Elisabeth von Speth-Zwyfalten, Abbess (1769–1789)
Maria Franziska Xaveria von Königfeld, Abbess (1789–1793)
Maria Violanta von Lerchenfeld-Premberg, Abbess (1793–1801)

Prince-Abbey of Obermünster (complete list) –
Maria Theresia von Sandizell, Abbess (1683–1719)
Anna Magdalena Franziska von Dondorff, Abbess (1719–1765)
Maria Franziska von Freudenberg, Abbess (1765–1775)
Maria Josepha von Neuenstein-Hubacker, Abbess (1775–1803)

Imperial County of Ortenburg (complete list) –
George Philip, Count (1684–1702)
John George, Count (1702–1725)
Charles III, Count (1725–1776)
Charles Albert, Count (1776–1787)
Joseph Charles Leopold, Count (1787–1805)

Palatinate-Birkenfeld-Gelnhausen –
John Charles, Count (1654–1704)
Frederick Bernard, Count (1704–1739)
John, Count (1739–1780)
Charles John Louis, Count (1780–1789)
William, Count (1789–1799)

Palatinate-Birkenfeld-Zweibrücken (complete list) –
Christian III, Count Palatine (1731–1735)
Christian IV, Count Palatine (1735–1775)
Charles III, Count Palatine (1775–1795)
Maximilian Joseph, Count Palatine (1795–1797)

Palatinate-Sulzbach –
Christian Augustus, Count (1632–1708)
Theodore Eustace, Count (1708–1732)
John Christian Joseph, Count (1732–1733)
Charles Theodore, Count (1733–1742), Elector (1742–1799)

Pappenheim (complete list) –
Christian Ernest, co-Count (1697–1721)
John Frederick, co-Count (1697–1731)
Frederick Ernest, co-Count (1721–1725)
Albert Louis Frederick, co-Count (1725–1733)
Frederick Ferdinand, Count (1733–1773)
John Frederick Ferdinand, Count (1773–1792)
Frederick William, Regent (1792–1797)
Charles Theodore Frederick Eugene Francis, Count (1792–1806)

Prince-Bishopric of Passau (complete list) –
John Philip of Lamberg, Prince-Bishop (1689–1712)
Raymund Ferdinand, Count of Rabatta, Prince-Bishop (1713–1722)
Joseph Dominic of Lamberg, Prince-Bishop (1723–1761)
Joseph Maria, Count of Thun, Prince-Bishop (1761–1763)
Leopold Ernst von Firmian, Prince-Bishop (1763–1783)
Joseph Francis Anton of Auersperg, Prince-Bishop (1783–1795)
Thomas John Caspar, Count of Thun-Hohenstein, Prince-Bishop (1795–1796)
Leopold Leonard, Prince-Bishop (1796–1803)

Prince-Bishopric of Regensburg (complete list) –
Joseph Clemens of Bavaria, Prince-bishop (1685–1716)
Clemens August I of Bavaria, Prince-bishop (1716–1719)
Johann Theodor of Bavaria, Prince-bishop (1719–1763)
Clemens Wenceslaus of Saxony, Prince-bishop (1763–1769)
Anton Ignaz von Fugger-Glött, Prince-bishop (1769–1787)
Maximilian Prokop von Toerring-Jettenbach, Prince-bishop (1787–1789)
Joseph Konrad von Schroffenberg, Prince-bishop (1790–1803)

Prince-Archbishopric of Salzburg (complete list) –
Johann Ernst von Thun und Hohenstein, Prince-archbishop (1687–1709)
Francis Anton od Harrach, Prince-archbishop (1709–1727)
Leopold Anton von Firmian, Prince-archbishop (1727–1744)
Jacob Ernest of Liechtenstein-Castelcorno, Prince-archbishop (1744–1747)
Andreas Jacob of Dietrichstein, Prince-archbishop (1747–1753)
Sigismund III of Schrattenbach, Prince-archbishop (1753–1771)
Hieronymus von Colloredo, Prince-archbishop (1772–1803)

Bohemian and Hungary

Kingdom of Bohemia, Kingdom of Hungary (complete list, complete list) –
Leopold I, King of Bohemia (1656–1705), of Hungary (1657–1705)
Joseph I, King (1705–1711)
Charles II, King (1711–1740)
Maria Theresa, Queen of Bohemia (1740–1741, 1743–1780), of Hungary (1740–1780)
Charles Albert, disputed King (1741–1743)
Joseph II, King (1780–1790)
Leopold II, King (1790–1792)
Francis II, King (1792–1835)

Duchy of Teschen (Cieszyn) (complete list) –
Leopold, Duke (1722–1729)
Francis I Stephen, Duke (1729–1765)
Joseph II, Duke (1765–1766)
Maria Christina, Duchess (1766–1797)
Albert Casimir, Duke (1766–1822)

Burgundian-Low Countries

Duchy of Brabant (complete list) –
Philip VI, Duke (1700–1706)
Charles IV, Duke (1706–1740)
Maria Theresa, Duchess (1740–1780)
Joseph, Duke (1780–1789)
Leopold, Duke (1790–1792)
Francis I, Duke (1792–1794)

County of Flanders (complete list) –
Philip VII, Count (1700–1706)
Charles V, Count (1714–1740)
Maria Theresa, Countess (1740–1780)
Francis I, Count (1740–1765)
Joseph I, Count (1780–1790)
Leopold, Count (1790–1792)
Francis II, Count (1792–1795)

Upper Guelders (complete list) –
Philippe Emanuel, Stadtholder (1699–1702)

County of Holland, Lordship of Utrecht, County of Zeeland (complete list) –
William III, Stadtholder (1672–1702)
Second Stadtholderless Period (1702–1747)

Duchy of Limburg (complete list) –
Philip VI, Duke (1700–1706)
Charles IV, Duke (1706–1740)
Maria Theresa, Duchess (1740–1780)
Joseph, Duke (1780–1790)
Leopold, Duke (1790–1792)
Francis, Duke (1792–1794)

Duchy of Luxemburg 
Limburg-Luxemburg dynasty (complete list) –
Philip V, Duke (1700–1712)
Maximilian II, Duke (1712–1713)
Charles V, Duke (1713–1740)
Mary II, Duchess (1740–1780)
Joseph, Duke (1780–1790)
Leopold, Duke (1790–1792)
Francis, Duke (1792–1794)
Stadtholders (complete list) –
Franz-Paul von Wallis, Stadtholder (1727–1734)

Namur (complete list) –
War of the Spanish Succession (1706–1714)
Charles IV, Margrave (1714–1740)
Mary II Theresa, Margrave (1740–1780)
Joseph I, Margrave (1780–1790)

Franconian

Prince-Bishopric of Bamberg (complete list) –
Lothar Franz von Schönborn, Prince-bishop (1693–1729)
Friedrich Karl von Schönborn, Prince-bishop (1729–1746)
Johann Philipp Anton von Franckenstein, Prince-bishop (1746–1753)
Franz Konrad von Stadion und Thannhausen, Prince-bishop (1753–1757)
Adam Friedrich von Seinsheim, Prince-bishop (1757–1779)
Franz Ludwig von Erthal, Prince-bishop (1779–1795)
Christoph Franz von Buseck, Prince-bishop (1795–1802)

County of Castell (complete list) –
Louis Frederick, Count (1709–1772)
Christian Adolph Frederick, Count of Castell-Remlingen (1743–1762)
inherited by Castell-Castell

Prince-Bishopric of Eichstätt (complete list, de) –
, Prince-bishop (1697–1704)
, Prince-bishop (1705–1725)
, Prince-bishop (1725–1736)
, Prince-bishop (1736–1757)
, Prince-bishop (1757–1781)
, Prince-bishop (1781–1790)
, Prince-bishop (1790–1802)

Hohenlohe-Bartenstein (complete list) –
, Count (1688–1729)
, Count (1729–1744), Prince (1744–1763)
, Prince (1763–1798)
Louis Aloysius, Prince (1799–1806)

Hohenlohe-Ingelfingen (complete list) –
Christian Kraft, Count (1701–1743)
Philipp Heinrich, Count (1743–1764), Prince (1764–1781)
, Prince (1781–1796)
Frederick Louis, Prince (1796–1806)
Adolf Karl Friedrich Ludwig, Prince (1806)

Hohenlohe-Jagstberg (complete list) –
, Prince (1798–1806)

Hohenlohe-Kirchberg (complete list) –
Frederick Eberhard, Count of Hohenlohe-Kirchberg (1701–1737)
Charles Augustus, Count (1737–1764), Prince (1764–1767)
, Prince (1767–1806)

Hohenlohe-Langenburg (complete list) –
Christian Kraft, Count (1699–1701)
Frederick Eberhard, Count (1699–1701)
Albert Wolfgang, Count (1699–1715)
Ludwig, Count (1715–1764), Prince (1764–1765)
Christian Albrecht, Prince (1765–1789)
Karl Ludwig, Prince (1789–1806)

Hohenlohe-Oehringen –
Johann Friedrich, co-Count of Hohenlohe-Neuenstein (1645–1677), Count of Hohenlohe-Oehringen (1677–1702)
Karl Ludwig, co-Count of Hohenlohe-Oehringen (1702–1708), Count of Hohenlohe-Weikersheim (1708–1756)
Johann Friedrich II, co-Count (1702–1708), Count (1708–1764), Prince (1764–1765)
, Prince (1765–1805)

Hohenlohe-Waldenburg-Pfedelbach –
Ludwig Gottfried of Hohenlohe-Waldenburg-Pfedelbach (1685–1728)

Schönborn (complete list) –
John Erwin, Baron (1668–1701), Count (1701–1705)
, Count (1705–1717)
divided between the lines Heusenstamm and Wiesentheid.

Schönborn-Heusenstamm (complete list) –
Anselm Francis, Count (1717–1726)
Anselm Posthumous, Count (1726–1801)

Schönborn-Wiesentheid (complete list) –
, Count (1717–1754)
Joseph Francis Bonaventura, Count (1754–1772)
Damian Hugo Erwin, Count (1772–1806)

Hohenlohe-Waldenburg-Schillingsfürst (complete list) –
Philipp Ernst zu Hohenlohe-Waldenburg-Schillingsfürst, Count (1697–1744), Prince (1744–1750)
Karl Albrecht I. zu Hohenlohe-Waldenburg-Schillingsfürst, Prince (1759–1793)
Charles Albert II, Prince (1793–1796)
Charles Albert III, Prince (1796–1806)

Prince-Bishopric of Würzburg (complete list) –
Johann Philipp von Greifenclau zu Vollraths, Prince-bishop (1699–1719)
Johann Philipp Franz von Schönborn, Prince-bishop (1719–1725)
Christoph Franz von Hutten, Prince-bishop (1724–1729)
Friedrich Karl von Schönborn, Prince-bishop (1729–1746)
Anselm Franz von Ingelheim, Prince-bishop (1746–1749)
Karl Philipp von Greifenclau zu Vollraths, Prince-bishop (1749–1754)
Adam Friedrich von Seinsheim, Prince-bishop (1755–1779)
Franz Ludwig von Erthal, Prince-bishop (1779–1795)
Georg Karl Ignaz von Fechenbach zu Laudenbach, Prince-bishop (1795–1803)

Electoral Rhenish

Arenberg (complete list) –
Leopold, Duke (1691–1754)
Charles Marie Raymond, Duke (1754–1778)
Louis Engelbert, Duke (1778–1803)

Elector-Archbishopric of Cologne (complete list) –
Joseph Clemens of Bavaria, Archbishop-elector (1688–1723)
Clemens August of Bavaria, Archbishop-elector (1723–1761)
Maximilian Frederick of Königsegg-Rothenfels, Archbishop-elector (1761–1784)
Maximilian Franz of Austria, Archbishop-elector (1784–1801)

Elector-Bishopric of Mainz (complete list) –
Lothar Franz von Schönborn, Archbishop-elector (1695–1729)
Francis Louis of Palatinate-Neuburg, Archbishop-elector (1729–1732)
Philipp Karl von Eltz-Kempenich, Archbishop-elector (1732–1743)
Johann Friedrich Karl von Ostein, Archbishop-elector (1743–1763)
Emmerich Joseph von Breidbach zu Bürresheim, Archbishop-elector (1763–1774)
Friedrich Karl Joseph von Erthal, Archbishop-elector (1774–1802)

Electoral Palatinate (complete list) –
Palatinate-Birkenfeld-Gelnhausen
Palatinate-Kleeburg
Palatinate-Sulzbach
Palatinate-Zweibrücken
Palatinate-Zweibrücken-Birkenfeld
John Charles, Count Palatine of Birkenfeld-Gelnhausen (1654–1704)
Christian II, Count Palatine of Zweibrücken-Birkenfeld (1671–1717)
Adolph John II, Count Palatine of Kleeburg (1689–1701)
John William, Elector (1690–1716)
Charles IV, Count Palatine of Zweibrücken (1697–1718)
Gustavus, Count Palatine of Kleeburg (1701–1718)
Gustavus, Count Palatine of Zweibrücken (1718–1731)
Frederick Bernard, Count Palatine of Birkenfeld-Gelnhausen (1704–1739)
Theodore Eustace, Count Palatine of Sulzbach (1708–1732)
Charles Philip, Elector (1716–1742)
Christian III, Count Palatine of Zweibrücken-Birkenfeld (1717–1731)
Christian III, Count Palatine of Zweibrücken (1731–1735)
John Christian, Count Palatine of Sulzbach (1732–1733)
Christian IV, Count Palatine of Zweibrücken (1735–1775)
John VI, Count Palatine of Birkenfeld-Gelnhausen (1739–1780)
Charles Theodore, Count Palatine of Sulzbach (1733–1742)
Charles Theodore, Elector of Palatinate (1742–1777)
Charles Theodore, Elector of Bavaria (1777–1799)
Charles August, Count Palatine of Zweibrücken (1775–1795)
Charles John, Count Palatine of Birkenfeld-Gelnhausen (1780–1789)
William, Count Palatine of Birkenfeld-Gelnhausen (1789–1799)
Maximilian I Joseph, Count of Palatine Zweibrücken (1795–1799), Elector of Palatinate and of Bavaria (1799–1803)

Thurn und Taxis (complete list) –
Eugen Alexander, Count (1676–1695), Prince (1695–1714)
Anselm Franz, Prince (1714–1739)
Alexander Ferdinand, Prince (1739–1773)
Karl Anselm, Prince (1773–1805)

Elector-Bishopric of Trier (complete list) –
Johann Hugo von Orsbeck, Archbishop-elector (1676–1711)
Charles Joseph of Lorraine, Archbishop-elector (1711–1715)
Franz Ludwig of Palatinate-Neuburg, Archbishop-elector (1716–1729)
Franz Georg von Schönborn-Buchheim, Archbishop-elector (1729–1756)
Johann Philipp von Walderdorf, Archbishop-elector (1756–1768)
Prince Clemens Wenceslaus of Saxony, Archbishop-elector (1768–1801)

Lower Rhenish–Westphalian

Bentheim-Bentheim (complete list) –
Arnold Maurice, Count (1668–1701)
Herman Frederick, Count (1701–1723)
Louis Francis, Count (1723–1731)
Frederick Charles, Count (1731–1803)

Bentheim-Steinfurt (complete list) –
Ernest, Count (1693–1713)
Charles Frederick, Count (1713–1733)
Charles Paul Ernest, Count (1733–1780)
Louis, Count (1780–1803)

Bentheim-Tecklenburg-Rheda (complete list) –
John Adolph, Count (1674–1701/04)
Friedrich Moritz, Count (1701/04–1710)
Moritz Kasimir I, Count (1710–1768)
Moritz Kasimir II, Count (1768–1805)

Princely Abbey of Corvey (de:complete list) –
, Prince-abbot (1696–1714)
Maximilian von Horrich, Prince-abbot (1714–1721)
Karl von Plittersdorf, Prince-abbot (1722–1737)
, Prince-abbot (1737–1758)
Philipp von Spiegel zum Desenberg, Prince-abbot (1758–1776)
, Prince-abbot (1776–1792)
Johann Karl Theodor von Brabeck, Prince-bishop (1792–1794)
, Prince-bishop (1794–1802)

Essen Abbey (complete list) –
Bernhardine Sophia of East Frisia and Rietberg, Princess-Abbess (1691–1726)
Francisca Christina, Princess-Abbess (1726–1776)
Maria Kunigunde of Saxony, Princess-Abbess (1776–1802)

County of East Frisia (complete list) –
Christian Everhard, Prince (1690–1708)
George Albert, Prince (1708–1734)
Charles Edzard, Prince (1734–1744)

Herford Abbey (complete list) –
Charlotte Sophia, Abbess (1688–1728)
Johanna Charlotte, Abbess (1729–1750)
Sophia, Abbess (1750–1764)
Princess Christine Charlotte of Hesse-Kassel, coadjutor Abbess (1766–1779)
Frederica Charlotte, Abbess (1764–1802)

Prince-Bishopric of Liège (complete list) –
Joseph Clemens of Bavaria, Prince-Bishop (1694–1723)
Georges-Louis de Berghes, Prince-Bishop (1724–1743)
Jean-Théodore of Bavaria, Prince-Bishop (1744–1763)
Charles-Nicolas d'Oultremont, Prince-Bishop (1763–1771)
François-Charles de Velbruck, Prince-Bishop (1772–1784)
César-Constantin-François de Hoensbroeck, Prince-Bishop (1784–1792)
François-Antoine-Marie de Méan, Prince-Bishop (1792–1794)

Limburg-Styrum-Borkelö (complete list) –
Albert Dominic, Count (1766–1776)
Otto Ernest Gelder, Count (1776–1806)

Limburg-Styrum-Bronchhorst (complete list) –
Frederick Theodore Ernest, Count (1766–1806)

Limburg-Styrum-Bronchhorst-Borkelö (complete list) –
Frederick William, Count (1679–1724)
Leopold, Count (1724–1728)
Otto Ernest Gelder, Count (1724–1766)

Limburg-Styrum-Gemen (complete list) –
Herman Otto II, Count (1657–1704)
Otto Leopold Ernest, Count (1704–1754)
Frederick Karl, Count (1754–1771)
August Philip, Count (1771–1782)

Limburg-Styrum-Iller-Aichheim (complete list) –
Maximilian William, Count (1657–1724)
Leopold, Count (1724–1726)
Charles Alois Joseph, Count (1726–1739)
Karl Josef, Count (1739–1798)
Ferdinand I, Count (1798–1800)

Limburg-Styrum-Styrum (complete list) –
Moritz Hermann, Count (1664–1703)
Christian Otto, Count (1703–1749)
, Count (1749–1760)
Philipp Ferdinand, Count (1760–1794)
, Countess (1794–1806)

County/ Principality of Lippe (complete list) –
Friedrich Adolf, Count (1697–1718)
Simon Heinrich Adolf, Count (1718–1734)
Simon August, Count (1734–1782)
Leopold I, Count (1782–1789), Prince (1789–1802)

Lippe-Biesterfeld (complete list) –
Friedrich Charles, Count (1762–1781)
Karl, Count (1781–1810)

Prince-Bishopric of Münster (complete list) –
Frederick Christian of Plettenberg, Prince-bishop (1688–1706)
Francis Arnold von Wolff-Metternich zur Gracht, Prince-bishop (1706–1718)
Clemens August I, Prince-bishop (1719–1761)
Maximilian Frederick of Königsegg-Rothenfels, Prince-bishop (1761–1784)
Maximilian Franz, Prince-bishop (1784–1801)

County/ Duchy of Oldenburg (complete list) –
Frederick II, Count (1699–1730)
Christian IX, Count (1730–1746)
Frederick III, Count (1746–1766)
Christian X, Count (1766–1773)
Paul I, Count (1773)
Frederick Augustus I, Count (1773), Duke (1774–1785)
Wilhelm I, Duke (1785–1810), Grand Duke (1815–1823)

Principality of Orange-Nassau –
John William Friso, Prince (1702–1711)
William IV (1711–1751)
William V (1751–1806)

Principality of Orange-Nassau (complete list) –
John William Friso, Prince (1702–1711)
William IV, Prince (1711–1751)
William V, Prince (1751–1806)

Prince-Bishopric of Osnabrück (complete list) –
Charles Joseph of Lorraine, Prince-bishop (1698–1715)
Ernest Augustus of York and Albany, Prince-bishop (1715–1728)
Clemens August of Bavaria, Prince-bishop (1728–1761)
Frederick of York and Albany, Prince-bishop (1764–1802)

Prince-Bishopric of Paderborn (complete list) –
, Prince-bishop (1683–1704)
, Prince-bishop (1704–1718)
Clemens August of Bavaria, Prince-bishop (1719–1761)
William Anton of Asseburg, Prince-bishop (1763–1782)
, Prince-bishop (1782–1789)
Franz Egon von Fürstenberg, Prince-bishop (1789–1825)

Wied-Dierdorf (complete list) –
Louis Frederick, Count (1664–1709)

Wied-Neuwied (complete list) –
Frederick William, Count (1698–1737)
John Frederick Alexander, Count (1737–1784), Prince (1784–1791)
Frederick Charles, Prince (1791–1802)

Wied-Runkel (complete list) –
Maximilian Heinrich, Count (1692–1706)
Johann Ludwig Adolph, Count (1706–1762)
Christian Ludwig, Count (1762–1791), Prince (1791)
Karl Ludwig Friedrich Alexander, Prince (1791–1806)

Upper Rhenish

Prince-Bishopric of Basel (complete list) –
Wilhelm Jakob Rink von Baldenstein, Prince-bishop (1693–1705)
Johann Konrad von Reinach-Hirtzbach, Prince-bishop (1705–1737)
Jakob Sigismund von Reinach-Steinbrunn, Prince-bishop (1737–1743)
Josef Wilhelm Rinck von Baldenstein, Prince-bishop (1744–1762)
Simon Nikolaus Euseb von Montjoye-Hirsingen, Prince-bishop (1762–1775)
Friedrich Ludwig Franz von Wangen zu Geroldseck, Prince-bishop (1775–1782)
Franz Joseph Sigismund von Roggenbach, Prince-bishop (1782–1794)
Franz Xaver von Neveu, Prince-bishop (1794–1828)

Free City of Frankfurt
Senior Mayors (de:complete list) –
Heinrich von Barckhausen, Senior Mayor (1700–1701)
Johann Adolph Stephan von Cronstetten II, Senior Mayor (1701–1702)
Dominicus Heyden, Senior Mayor (1702–1703)
Nicolaus August Ruland, Senior Mayor (1703–1704)
Johann Arnold Mohr von Mohrenhelm, Senior Mayor (1704–1705)
Johann Adolph von Glauburg I, Senior Mayor (1705–1706)
Heinrich von Barckhausen, Senior Mayor (1706–1707)
Johann Adolph Stephan von Cronstetten II, Senior Mayor (1707–1708)
Dominicus Heyden, Senior Mayor (1708–1709)
Philipp Jacob Fleckhammer von Aystetten, Senior Mayor (1709–1710)
Johann Georg von Holzhausen, Senior Mayor (1710–1711)
, Senior Mayor (1711–1712)
Johann Adolph von Glauburg I, Senior Mayor (1712–1713)
Heinrich von Barckhausen, Senior Mayor (1713–1714)
Johann Georg von Holzhausen, Senior Mayor (1714–1715)
Johann Philipp Orth II, Senior Mayor (1715–1716)
Johann Martin von den Birgden, Senior Mayor (1716–1717)
, Senior Mayor (1717–1718)
Johann Philipp von Kellner I, Senior Mayor (1718–1719)
Konrad Hieronymus Eberhard gen. Schwind, Senior Mayor (1719–1720)
Ludwig Adolph von Syvertes, Senior Mayor (1720–1721)
Johann Christoph von Stetten, Senior Mayor (1721–1722)
Bartholomäus von Barckhausen, Senior Mayor (1722–1723)
Georg Friedrich Faust von Aschaffenburg, Senior Mayor (1723–1724)
Johann Hieronymus von Glauburg, Senior Mayor (1724–1725)
, Senior Mayor (1725–1726)
Johann Adolph von Glauburg II, Acting Mayor (1726)
Konrad Hieronymus Eberhard gen. Schwind, Senior Mayor (1726–1727)
, Senior Mayor (1727–1728)
Johann Daniel Fleischbein von Kleeberg, Senior Mayor (1728)
Johann Adolph von Glauburg III, Acting Mayor (1728)
Achilles Augustus von Lersner, Senior Mayor (1728–1729)
Johann Christoph Ochs von Ochsenstein, Senior Mayor (1729–1730)
Achilles Augustus von Lersner, Senior Mayor (1730–1731)
Johann Carl von Kaib, Senior Mayor (1731–1732)
, Senior Mayor (1732–1733)
Johann Hieronymus von Holzhausen, Senior Mayor (1733–1734)
Johann Jacob von Bertram, Senior Mayor (1734–1735)
Johann Philipp von Syvertes, Senior Mayor (1735–1736)
Johann Carl von Kaib, Senior Mayor (1736–1737)
Johann Philipp von Kellner II, Senior Mayor (1737–1738)
, Senior Mayor (1738–1739)
Johann Carl von Kaib, Senior Mayor (1739–1740)
Johann Philipp von Syvertes, Senior Mayor (1740–1741)
Johann Christoph Ochs von Ochsenstein, Senior Mayor (1741)
Remigius Seyffart von Klettenberg, Acting Mayor (1741)
Johann Wolfgang Textor, Senior Mayor (1741–1742)
Johann Carl von Kaib, Senior Mayor (1742–1743)
Johann Wolfgang Textor, Senior Mayor (1743–1744)
Johann Georg Schweitzer Edler von Wiederhold, Senior Mayor (1744–1745)
Johann Carl von Fichard, Senior Mayor (1745–1746)
Friedrich Maximilian von Günderrode, Senior Mayor (1746–1747)
, Senior Mayor (1747–1748)
Johann Georg Schweitzer Edler von Wiederhold, Senior Mayor (1748–1749)
Friedrich Maximilian von Günderrode, Senior Mayor (1749–1750)
Johann Carl von Fichard, Senior Mayor (1750–1751)
Friedrich Maximilian von Lersner, Senior Mayor (1751–1752)
Johann Georg Schweitzer Edler von Wiederhold, Senior Mayor (1752–1753)
Johann Carl von Fichard, Senior Mayor (1753–1754)
Remigius Seyffart von Klettenberg, Senior Mayor (1754–1755)
Johann Carl von Fichard, Senior Mayor (1755–1756)
Friedrich Wilhelm von Völcker, Senior Mayor (1756–1757)
Erasmus Schlösser, Senior Mayor (1757–1758)
Philipp Jacob von Stallburg, Senior Mayor (1758–1759)
Remigius Seyffart von Klettenberg, Senior Mayor (1759–1760)
Johann Carl von Fichard, Senior Mayor (1760–1761)
Johann Maximilian von Holzhausen, Senior Mayor (1761–1762)
, Senior Mayor (1762–1763)
Johann Isaac Moors, Senior Mayor (1763–1764)
Erasmus Schlösser, Senior Mayor (1764–1765)
Hieronymus Maximilian von Glauburg, Senior Mayor (1765–1766)
Johann Carl von Fichard, Senior Mayor (1766–1767)
Friedrich Maximilian Baur von Eysseneck, Senior Mayor (1767–1768)
Johann Philipp von Heyden, Senior Mayor (1768–1769)
Johann Isaac Moors, Senior Mayor (1769–1770)
Hieronymus Maximilian von Glauburg, Senior Mayor (1770–1771)
, Senior Mayor (1771–1772)
Johann Philipp von Heyden, Senior Mayor (1772–1773)
Hieronymus Maximilian von Glauburg, Senior Mayor (1773–1774)
, Senior Mayor (1774–1775)
Johann Philipp von Heyden, Senior Mayor (1775–1776)
Hieronymus Maximilian von Glauburg, Senior Mayor (1776–1777)
Johann Friedrich von Wiesenhütten, Senior Mayor (1777–1778)
Friedrich Adolph von Glauburg, Senior Mayor (1779–1780)
Johann Daniel Fleischbein von Kleeberg II, Senior Mayor (1780–1781)
Johann Friedrich von Wiesenhütten, Senior Mayor (1781–1782)
Friedrich Adolph von Glauburg, Senior Mayor (1782–1783)
, Senior Mayor (1783–1784)
Johann Friedrich von Wiesenhütten, Senior Mayor (1784–1785)
, Senior Mayor (1785–1786)
Friedrich Adolph von Glauburg, Senior Mayor (1786–1787)
Johann Friedrich Maximilian von Stallburg, Senior Mayor (1787–1788)
Friedrich Adolph von Glauburg, Senior Mayor (1788–1789)
Friedrich Maximilian von Lersner II, Senior Mayor (1789–1790)
Johann Christoph von Lauterbach, Senior Mayor (1790–1791)
, Senior Mayor (1791–1792)
Johann Christoph von Lauterbach, Senior Mayor (1792–1793)
, Senior Mayor (1793–1794)
Adolph Carl von Humbracht, Senior Mayor (1794–1795)
Johann Nicolaus Olenschlager von Olenstein, Senior Mayor (1795–1796)
Johann Christoph von Lauterbach, Senior Mayor (1796–1797)
Adolph Carl von Humbracht, Senior Mayor (1797–1798)
Friedrich Maximilian von Lersner II, Senior Mayor (1798–1799)
Adolph Carl von Humbracht, Senior Mayor (1799–1800)
, Senior Mayor (1800–1801)
Stadtschultheißens (de:complete list) –
Johann Erasmus Seyffart von Klettenberg und Rhoda, Stadtschultheißen (1696–1716)
Johann Georg von Holzhausen, Stadtschultheißen (1716–1721)
, Stadtschultheißen (1721–1741)
, Stadtschultheißen (1741–1747)
 Stadtschultheißen (1747–1771)
Johann Isaac Moors, Stadtschultheißen (1771–1777)
Johann Martin Ruppel, Stadtschultheißen (1777–1788)
Johann Friedrich Maximilian von Stalburg, Stadtschultheißen (1788–1802)
Wilhelm Carl Ludwig Moors, Stadtschultheißen (1788–1806)

Princely Abbey of Fulda (complete list) –
, Prince-abbot (1700–1714)
, Prince-abbot (1714–1726)
Adolphus von Dalberg, Prince-abbot (1726–1737)
, Prince-abbot (1737–1752), Prince-bishop (1752–1756)
, Prince-bishop (1757–1759)
Heinrich von Bibra, Prince-bishop (1759–1788)
, Prince-bishop (1789–1802)

Hesse-Darmstadt (complete list) –
Ernest Louis, Landgrave (1678–1739)
Louis VIII, Landgrave (1739–1768)
Louis IX, Landgrave (1768–1790)
Louis X, Landgrave of Hesse-Darmstadt (1790–1806), Grand Duke of Hesse (1806–1830)

Hesse-Homburg (complete list) –
Frederick II, Landgrave (1679–1708)
Frederick III Jacob, Landgrave (1708–1746)
Frederick IV Charles, Landgrave (1746–1751)
Ulrike Louise of Solms-Braunfels, Regent (1751–1766)
Frederick V, Landgrave (1751–1820)

Hesse-Kassel (complete list) –
Charles I, Landgrave (1670–1730)
Frederick V, Landgrave (1730–1751)
William XI, Landgrave (1751–1760)
Frederick VIII, Landgrave (1760–1785)
William XIII, Landgrave of Hesse-Kassel (1785–1803), Elector of Hesse (1803–1807, 1813–1821)

Hesse-Philippsthal (complete list) –
Philip, Landgrave (1663–1721)
Charles I, Landgrave (1721–1770)
William, Landgrave (1770–1806)

Hesse-Philippsthal-Barchfeld (complete list) –
William, Landgrave (1721–1761)
Frederick, Landgrave (1761–1777)
Adolph, Landgrave (1777–1803)

Hesse-Rotenburg (complete list) –
William the Elder, Landgrave (1693–1725)
Ernest Leopold, Landgrave (1725–1749)
Constantine, Landgrave of Hesse-Rotenburg (1749–1778), Landgrave of Hesse-Wanfried-Rheinfels (1755–1778)
Charles Emmanuel, Landgrave (1778–1812)

Hesse-Wanfried-Rheinfels (complete list) –
Charles, Landgrave (1676–1711)
William II the Younger, Landgrave (1711–1731)
Christian, Landgrave (1731–1755)
Constantine, Landgrave of Hesse-Rotenburg (1749–1778), Landgrave of Hesse-Wanfried-Rheinfels (1755–1778)

Isenburg-Birstein (complete list) –
Wolfgang Ernest I, Count (1711–1744), Prince (1744–1754)
Wolfgang Ernest II, Prince (1754–1803)

Isenburg-Büdingen (complete list) –
Johann Ernst II. von Isenburg und Büdingen, Count (1693–1708)
Ernst Casimir I. von Isenburg-Büdingen, Count (1708–1749)
Gustav Friedrich von Isenburg und Büdingen, Count (1749–1768)
Ludwig Casimir von Isenburg und Büdingen, Count (1768–1775)
Ernst Casimir II. von Isenburg und Büdingen, Count (1775–1801)

Isenburg-Büdingen-Birstein (complete list) –
Wilhelm Moritz I, Count (1685–1711)
Wolfgang Ernest I, Prince (1711–1754)
Wolfgang Ernest II, Prince (1754–1803)

Isenburg-Offenbach (complete list) –
John Philip, Count (1685–1711)
Christian Henry, Count (1685–1711)

Isenburg-Meerholz (complete list) –
George Albert, Count (1691–1724)
Charles Frederick, Count (1724–1774)
John Frederick William, Count (1774–1802)

Isenburg-Philippseich (complete list) –
William Maurice II, Count (1711–1772)
Christian Charles, Count (1772–1779)
Charles William, Count (1779–1781)
Henry Ferdinand, Count (1779–1806)

Isenburg-Wächtersbach –
Ferdinand Maximilian I, Count (1673–1703)
Ferdinand Maximilian II, Count (1703–1755)
Ferdinand Casimir I, Count (1755–1778)
Ferdinand Casimir II, Count (1778–1780)
Albert Augustus, Count (1780–1782)
William Reinhard, Count (1782–1785)
Adolph, Count (1785–1798)
Louis Maximilian I, Count (1798–1805)

Westerburg-Leiningen-Leiningen  (complete list: de) –
Philipp Ludwig, Count of Leiningen-Leiningen (1668–1705)

Leiningen-Dagsburg-Falkenburg – 
Christian Karl Reinhard, Count (1698–1766)
Maria Louise Albertine, Countess (1766–c.1803)

Leiningen-Schaumburg (de:complete list) –
George Friedrich, Count (1698–1708)

Leiningen-Westerburg-Altleiningen (de:complete list) –
Christopher Christian, Count (1695–1728)
George Hermann, Count (1728–1751)
Christian Johann, Count (1751–1770)
Christian Karl, Count (1770–1806)

Leiningen-Westerburg-Neuleiningen (de:complete list) –
George II Karl Ludwig, Count (1695–1726)
George Karl I August Ludwig, Count (1726–1787)
Karl II Gustav Reinhard Waldemar, Count (1787–1798)
Ferdinand Karl III, Count (1798–1806)

Leiningen-Hardenburg (de:complete list) –
Johann Friedrich, Count (1684–1722)
Friedrich Magnus, Count (1722–1756)
Carl Friedrich Wilhelm, Count (1756–1779), Prince (1779–1807)

Principality of Leiningen (de:complete list) –
Carl Friedrich Wilhelm, Count (1756–1779), Prince (1779–1807)

Duchy of Lorraine (complete list) –
Leopold, Duke (1690–1729)
Francis III, Duke (1729–1737)
Stanisław I, Duke (1737–1766)

Nassau-Saarbrücken (complete list) –
Louis Crato, Count (1677–1713)
Charles Louis, Count (1713–1723)
Frederick Louis, Count (1723–1728)
Charles, Count (1728–1735)
William Henry II, Count (1735/42–1768)
Louis, Count (1768–1794)
Henry, Count (1794–1797)

Nassau-Usingen (complete list) –
Walrad, Count (1659–1688), Prince (1688–1702)
William Henry, Prince (1702–1718)
Charles, Prince (1718–1775)
Charles William, Prince (1775–1803)

Nassau-Weilburg (complete list) –
John Ernst, Count (1675–1688), Princely count (1688–1719)
Charles August, Princely count (1719–1753)
Charles Christian, Princely count (1753–1788)
Frederick William, Princely count (1788–1816)

Salm-Dhaun (complete list) –
Charles, Rhinegrave (1693–1733)
John Philip III, Rhinegrave (1733–1742)
Christian Otto, Rhinegrave (1742–1748)

Salm-Hoogstraten (complete list) –
William Florentin, Rhinegrave (1696–1707)
Nicolas Leopold I, Prince (1707–1770)

Salm-Kyrburg (complete list) –
Philipp Joseph of Salm-Leuze, Rhinegrave (1716–1743), Prince (1743–1779)
Frederick III, Prince (1779–1794)
Frederick IV, Prince (1794–1813)

Salm-Leuze (complete list) –
Henry Gabriel, Rhinegrave (1696–1716)
Philipp Joseph of Salm-Leuze, Rhinegrave (1716–1743), Prince (1743–1779)

Salm-Püttlingen (complete list) –
Vollrath Victor, Rhinegrave (1697–1730)
John, Rhinegrave (1730–1750)
Frederick William, Rhinegrave (?–1748)
John Frederick, Rhinegrave (1748–1750)
Charles Leopold Louis, Rhinegrave (1750)
Frederick William, Rhinegrave (1750)

Salm-Reifferscheid-Bedburg (complete list) –	
Francis William, Altgrave (1673–1734)
Charles Anthony, Altgrave (1734–1755)
Sigismund, Altgrave (1755–1798)
Francis William, Altgrave (1798–1804), Prince (1804–1806)

Salm-Reifferscheid-Dyck (complete list) –
Francis Ernest, Count (1684–1727)
Augustus Eugene Bernard, Count (1727–1767)
William, Count (1767–1775)
Joseph, Count (1775–1806)

Salm-Reifferscheid-Hainsbach (complete list) –
Leopold Anthony, Altgrave (1734–1769)
Francis Wenceslaus, Altgrave (1769–1811)

Salm-Reifferscheid-Krautheim (complete list) –
Francis William, Altgrave (1798–1804), Prince (1804–1806)

Salm-Reifferscheid-Raitz (complete list) –
Anthony, Altgrave (1734–1769)
Charles Joseph, Altgrave (1769–1790), Prince (1790–1811)

Salm-Salm (complete list) –
Charles Theodore, Prince of Salm, Count of Salm-Salm (1663–1710)
Ludwig Otto, Prince of Salm, Count of Salm-Salm (1710–1736)
Nikolaus Leopold, Prince (1739–1770)
Ludwig Karl Otto, Prince (1770–1778)
Konstantin Alexander, Prince (1778–1813)

Sayn-Wittgenstein-Berleburg (complete list) –
Casimir, Count (1694–1741)
Ludwig Ferdinand, Count (1741–1773)
Christian Heinrich, Count (1773–1792), Prince (1792–1800)
Albrecht, Prince (1800–1806)

Sayn-Wittgenstein-Hohenstein (complete list) –
Friedrich II, Count (1796–1801), Prince (1801–1806)

Prince-Bishopric of Sion (complete list) –
Adrien V of Riedmatten, Prince-Bishop (1672–1701)
François-Joseph Supersaxo, Prince-Bishop (1701–1734)
Jean-Joseph-Arnold Blatter, Prince-Bishop (1734–1752)
Jean-Hildebrand Roten, Prince-Bishop (1752–1760)
François-Joseph-Frédéric Ambuel, Prince-Bishop (1760–1780)
François-Melchior-Joseph Zen-Ruffinen, Prince-Bishop (1780–1790)
Joseph Anton Blatter, Prince-Bishop (1790–1807)

Solms-Braunfels (complete list) –
Wilhelm Moritz, Count (1693–1720)
Friedrich William, Count (1720–1742), Prince (1742–1761)
Ferdinand Wilhelm Ernst, Prince (1761–1783)
Wilhelm Christian Karl, Prince (1783–1806)

Prince-Bishopric of Speyer (complete list) –
Johann Hugo von Orsbeck, Prince-bishop (1675–1711)
Heinrich Hartard of Rollingen, Prince-bishop (1711–1719)
Hugo Damian of Schönborn, Prince-bishop (1719–1743)
Franz Christoph of Hutten zu Stolzenberg, Prince-bishop (1743–1770)
Damian August Philipp Karl, Count of Limburg-Stirum-Vehlen, Prince-bishop (1770–1797)

Prince-Bishopric of Strasbourg (complete list) –
Wilhelm Egon von Fürstenberg, Prince-Bishop (1682–1704)
Armand Gaston Maximilien de Rohan, Prince-Bishop (1704–1749)
François-Armand-Auguste de Rohan-Soubise-Ventadour, Prince-Bishop (1749–1756)
Louis César Constantin, prince de Rohan-Guéméné, Prince-Bishop (1756–1779)
Louis René Édouard de Rohan-Guéméné, Prince-Bishop (1779–1801)

County of Waldeck and Pyrmont –
Christian Louis,  Count of Waldeck-Wildungen (1645–1692), of Waldeck and Pyrmont (1692–1706)
Friedrich Anton Ulrich, Count (1706–1712), Prince (1712–1728)

Principality of Waldeck and Pyrmont (complete list) –
Friedrich Anton Ulrich, Count (1706–1712), Prince (1712–1728)
Karl August, Prince (1728–1763)
Friedrich Karl August, Prince (1763–1812)

Prince-Bishopric of Worms (complete list) –
Count Palatine Francis Louis of Neuburg, Prince-bishop (1694–1732)
Franz Georg von Schönborn, Prince-bishop (1732–1756)
Johann Friedrich Karl von Ostein, Prince-bishop (1756–1763)
Johann Philipp II von Walderdorf, Prince-bishop (1763–1768)
Emmerich Joseph von Breidbach zu Bürresheim, Prince-bishop (1768–1774)
Friedrich Karl Josef von Erthal, Prince-bishop (1774–1802)

Lower Saxon

Electorate of Saxony, Albertine (complete list) –
Augustus II the Strong, Elector (1694–1733), Regent of Saxe-Merseburg (1694–1712)
Frederick Augustus II, Elector (1733–1763)
Frederick Christian, Elector (1763)
Maria Antonia of Bavaria, Regent (1763–c.1768)
Frederick Augustus the Just, Elector (1763–1806), King (1806–1827)

Saxe-Lauenburg (complete list) –
George William, occupying Duke (1689–1705)
title then held successively by the monarchs of Britain, Denmark, and Prussia

Saxe-Zeitz (complete list) –
Moritz Wilhelm, Duke (1681–1718)

Saxe-Zeitz-Pegau-Neustadt (complete list) –
Frederick Henry, Duke of Saxe-Zeitz-Pegau-Neustadt, Duke (1699–1713)
inherited by the Electorate of Saxony

Saxe-Weissenfels (complete list) –
Johann Georg, Duke (1697–1712)
Christian, Duke (1712–1736)
Johann Adolf II, Duke (1736–1746)
inherited by the Electorate of Saxony

Saxe-Merseburg (complete list) –
Augustus II the Strong, Elector (1694–1733), Regent of Saxe-Merseburg (1694–1712)
Erdmuthe Dorothea of Saxe-Zeitz, Regent (1694–1712)
Maurice William, Duke (1694–1731)
Heinrich, Duke (1731–1738)
inherited by the Electorate of Saxony

Bremen-Verden (complete list) –
Charles XII, Duke (1697–1718)
Ulrika Eleonora, Duchess (1718–1719)
George I, Duke (1715–1727)
George II, Duke (1727–1760)
George III, Duke (1760–1807, 1813–1820)

Principality of Brunswick-Wolfenbüttel/ Principality of Wolfenbüttel (complete list) –
Rudolf Augustus, Prince (1666–1704)
Anthony Ulrich, Prince (1685–1702, 1704–1714)
Augustus William, Prince (1714–1731)
Louis Rudolph, Prince (1731–1735)
Ferdinand Albert II, Prince of Bevern (1687–1735), of Brunswick-Wolfenbüttel (1735)
Charles I, Prince (1735–1780)
Charles William Ferdinand, Prince (1780–1806)

Gandersheim Abbey (complete list) –
Henriette Christine, Princess-Abbess (1693–1712)
Marie Elisabeth zu Mecklenburg, Princess-Abbess (1712–1713)
Elisabeth Ernestine Antonie, (1713–1766)
Therese Natalie, Princess-Abbess (1767–1778)
Augusta Dorothea, Princess-Abbess (1778–1810)

Free City of Hamburg (complete list) –
Peter Lütkens, Mayor (1687–1717)
Peter von Lengerke (or Lengerks), Mayor (1697–1709)
Julius Surland, Mayor (1702)
Gerhard Schröder, Mayor (1703)
Paul Paulsen, Mayor (1704)
Lucas von Borstel, Mayor (1709–1716)
Ludwig Becceler, Mayor (1712)
Bernhard Matfeld, Mayor (1716–1720)
Garlieb Sillem, Mayor (1717)
Hinrich Diedrich Wiese, Mayor (1720–1728)
Hans Jacob Faber, Mayor (1722)
Johann Anderson, Mayor (1723)
Rütger Rulant, Mayor (1728–1742)
Daniel Stockfleth, Mayor (1729)
Martin Lucas Schele, Mayor (1733)
Johann H. Luis, Mayor (1739)
Cornelius Poppe, Mayor (1741)
Conrad Widow, Mayor (1742–1754)
Nicolaus Stempeel, Mayor (1743)
Clemens Samuel Lipstrop, Mayor (1749)
Lucas von Spreckelsen, Mayor (1750)
Martin H. Schele, Mayor (1751)
Lucas Corthum, Mayor (1751)
Nicolaus Schuback, Mayor (1759)
Peter Greve, Mayor (1759)
Vincent Rumpff, Mayor (1765)
Johann Schlüter, Mayor (1774)
Albert Schule, Mayor (1778)
Frans Doormann, Mayor (1780)
Jacob Albrecht von Sienen, Mayor (1781)
Johann Anderson, Mayor (1781)
Johann Luis, Mayor (1784)
Johann Adolph Poppe, Mayor (1786)
Martin Dorner, Mayor (1788)
Franz Anton Wagener, Mayor (1790–1801)
Daniel Lienau, Mayor (1798)
Peter Hinrich Widow, Mayor (1800–1802)

Electorate of Hanover (Brunswick-Lüneburg) (complete list) –
George I, Elector-designate (1698–1708), Elector (1708–1727)
George II, Elector (1727–1760)
George III, Elector (1760–1806), King (1814–1820)

Prince-Bishopric of Hildesheim (complete list) –
, Prince-bishop (1688–1702)
Joseph Clemens of Bavaria, Prince-bishop (1702–1723)
Clemens August of Bavaria, Prince-bishop (1723–1761)
, Prince-bishop (1763–1789)
Franz Egon von Fürstenberg, Prince-bishop (1789–1803)

Holstein-Glückstadt
Dukes (complete list) –
Frederick IV, Duke (1699–1730)
Christian VI, Duke (1730–1746)
Frederick V, Duke (1746–1766)
Christian VII, Duke of Holstein-Glückstadt (1766–1773), of Holstein (1773–1808)
Statholders (complete list) –
Friedrich von Ahlefeldt, Statholder (1697–1708)
Carl von Ahlefeldt, Count of Langeland (1708–1722), Statholder (1708–1722)
Charles Augustus of Brandenburg-Kulmbach, Statholder (1730–1731)
Frederick Ernest of Brandenburg-Kulmbach, Statholder (1731–1762)
Friedrich Ludwig von Ahlefeldt-Dehn, Statholder (1762–1768)
Charles of Hesse-Kassel, Statholder (1768–1836)

Duchy of Holstein 
Dukes (complete list) –	
Christian VII, Duke of Holstein-Glückstadt (1766–1773), of Holstein (1773–1808)
Statholders (complete list) –
Charles of Hesse-Kassel, Statholder (1768–1836)

Holstein-Gottorp (complete list) –
Frederick IV, Duke (1694–1702)
Charles Frederick, Duke (1702–1739)
Karl Peter Ulrich, Duke (1739–1762)
Paul, Duke (1762–1773)

Prince-bishopric of Lübeck (complete list) –
August Frederick of Holstein-Gottorp, Prince-bishop (1666–1705)
Christian August of Holstein-Gottorp, Prince-bishop (1705–1726)
Charles August of Holstein-Gottorp, Prince-bishop (1726–1727)
Adolf Friedrich (1727–1750)
Frederick August I, Prince-bishop (1750–1785)
Peter Frederick Louis, Prince-bishop (1785–1803)

Free City of Lübeck (complete list) –
, Mayor (1694–1707)
, Mayor (1695–1704)
, Mayor (1697–1705)
, Mayor (1703)
, Mayor (1708)
, Mayor (1706)
, Mayor (1708)
, Mayor (1715)
, Mayor (1717)
, Mayor (1717)
, Mayor (1722)
, Mayor (1731)
, Mayor (1724)
, Mayor (1728)
, Mayor (1732)
, Mayor (1731)
, Mayor (1735)
, Mayor (1732)
, Mayor (1738)
, Mayor (1744)
, Mayor (1744)
, Mayor (1743)
, Mayor (1757)
, Mayor (1750)
, Mayor (1750)
, Mayor (1761)
, Mayor (1757)
, Mayor (1769)
, Mayor (1761)
, Mayor (1765)
, Mayor (1773)
, Mayor (1773)
, Mayor (1789)
, Mayor (1777)
, Mayor (1778)
, Mayor (1781)
, Mayor (1783)
, Mayor (1768)
, Mayor (1790)
, Mayor (1792)
, Mayor (1786)
, Mayor (1794)
, Mayor (1799)
, Mayor (1800)

Principality of Lüneburg (complete list) –
George William, Prince of Calenberg (1648–1665), of Lüneburg (1658–1705)
inherited by the Electorate of Hanover (Brunswick-Lüneburg)

Mecklenburg (complete list) –
Frederick William I, Duke of Mecklenburg-Schwerin (1692–1695, 1701–1713), Duke of Mecklenburg (1695–1701)

Duchy of Mecklenburg-Schwerin (complete list) –
Frederick William I, Duke of Mecklenburg-Schwerin (1692–1695, 1701–1713), Duke of Mecklenburg (1695–1701)
Charles Leopold I, Duke (1713–1728)
Christian Louis II, Duke (1728–1756)
Frederick II the Pious, Duke (1756–1785)
Frederick Francis I, Duke (1785–1815), Grand Duke (1815–1837)

Duchy of Mecklenburg-Strelitz (complete list) –
Adolphus Frederick II, Duke (1701–1708)
Adolphus Frederick III, Duke (1708–1752)
Adolphus Frederick IV, Duke (1752–1794)
Charles II, Duke (1794–1815), Grand Duke (1815–1816)

County/ Duchy of Oldenburg (complete list) –
Frederick II, Count (1699–1730)
Christian IX, Count (1730–1746)
Frederick III, Count (1746–1766)
Christian X, Count (1766–1773)
Paul I, Count (1773)
Frederick Augustus I, Count (1773–1774), Duke (1774–1785)
Wilhelm, Duke (1784/85–1810, 1813–1815), Grand Duke (1815–1823)
Peter I, Regent (1785–1823), Grand Duke (1823–1829)

County of Rantzau –
, Count (1697–1721)
, Count (1721–1726)

Upper Saxon

Anhalt-Bernburg (complete list) –
Victor Amadeus, Prince (1656–1718)
Karl Frederick, Prince (1718–1721)
Victor Frederick, Prince (1721–1765)
Frederick Albert, Prince (1765–1796)
Alexius Frederick Christian, Prince (1796–1807), Duke (1807–1834)

Anhalt-Zeitz-Hoym/ Anhalt-Bernburg-Schaumburg-Hoym (complete list) –
Lebrecht, Prince (1718–1727)
Victor I, Prince (1727–1772)
Karl Louis, Prince (1772–1806)

Anhalt-Dessau (complete list) –
Leopold I, Prince (1693–1747)
Leopold II Maximilian, Prince (1747–1751)
Dietrich of Anhalt-Dessau, Regent (1751–1758)
Leopold III, Prince (1751–1758), Duke (1758–1817), Regent of Anhalt-Köthen (1812–1817)

Anhalt-Dornburg (complete list) –
John Louis I, Prince (1667–1704)
John Louis II, co-Prince (1704–1742)
John Augustus, co-Prince (1704–1709)
Christian Louis, co-Prince (1704–1710)
John Frederick, co-Prince (1704–1742)
Christian August, co-Prince of Anhalt-Dornburg (1704–1747), of Anhalt-Zerbst (1742–1747)
united with Anhalt-Zerbst

Anhalt-Köthen (complete list) –
Emmanuel Lebrecht, Prince (1671–1704)
Gisela Agnes of Rath, Regent (1704–1715)
Leopold, Prince (1704–1728)
Augustus Louis, Prince (1728–1755)
Charles George Lebrecht, Prince (1755–1789)
Augustus Christian Frederick, Prince (1789–1806), Duke (1806–1812)

Anhalt-Zerbst (complete list) –
Charles, Prince (1667–1718)
John Augustus, Prince (1718–1742)
John Louis II, co-Prince (1742–1746)
Christian August, co-Prince of Anhalt-Dornburg (1704–1747), of Anhalt-Zerbst (1742–1747)
Joanna Elisabeth of Holstein-Gottorp, Regent (1747–1752)
Frederick August, Prince (1747–1793)
divided among Anhalt-Bernburg, Anhalt-Dessau, and Anhalt-Köthen

Electorate of Brandenburg, Duchy/ Kingdom of Prussia (complete list, complete list) –
Frederick I, Elector (1688–1713), Duke (1688–1701), King (1701–1713)
Frederick William I, Elector, King (1713–1740)
Frederick II the Great, Elector, King (1740–1786)
Frederick William II, Elector, King (1786–1797)
Frederick William III, Elector (1797–1806), King (1797–1840)

Brandenburg-Ansbach  (complete list) –
George Frederick II, Margrave (1692–1703)
William Frederick, Margrave (1703–1723)
Charles William Frederick, Margrave (1723–1757)
Charles Alexander, Margrave (1757–1791)

Brandenburg-Bayreuth (formally Brandenburg-Kulmbach) (complete list) –
Christian Ernst, Margrave (1655–1712)
George William, Margrave (1712–1726)
George Frederick Charles, Margrave (1726–1735)
Frederick, Margrave (1735–1763)
Frederick Christian, Margrave (1763–1769)
Charles Alexander, Margrave (1769–1791)

Reuss-Ebersdorf (complete list) –
Heinrich X, Count (1678–1711)
Heinrich XXIX, Count (1711–1747)
Heinrich XXIV, Count (1747–1779)
Heinrich LI, Count (1779–1806), Prince (1806–1822)

Reuss-Greiz (complete list) –
Heinrich XI, Prince (1778–1800)
Heinrich XIII, Prince (1800–1817)

Reuss-Lobenstein (complete list) –
Heinrich III, Lord (1671–1673), Count (1673–1710)
Heinrich XV, Count (1710–1739)
Heinrich II, Count (1739–1782)
Heinrich XXXV, Count (1782–1790), Prince (1790–1805)

Reuss-Schleiz (complete list) –
Heinrich I, Count (1673–1692)
Heinrich XI, Count (1692–1726)
Heinrich I, Count (1726–1744)
Heinrich XII, Count (1744–1784)
Heinrich XLII, Count (1784–1806), Prince (1806–1818)

Saxe-Eisenberg (complete list) –
Christian, co-Duke of Saxe-Gotha-Altenburg (1675–1680), Duke of Saxe-Eisenberg (1680–1707)
inherited by Saxe-Hildburghausen

Saxe-Römhild (complete list) –
Henry, co-Duke of Saxe-Gotha-Altenburg (1675–1680), Duke of Saxe-Römhild (1680–1710)
divided in dispute

Saxe-Eisenach (complete list) –
John William III, Duke (1698–1729)
Wilhelm Heinrich, Duke (1729–1741)
inherited by Saxe-Weimar to form Saxe-Weimar-Eisenach

Saxe-Coburg-Saalfeld (complete list) –
John Ernest IV, co-Duke of Saxe-Gotha-Altenburg (1675–1680), Duke of Saxe-Saalfeld (1680–1699), of Saxe-Coburg-Saalfeld (1699–1729)
Christian Ernest II, Duke (1729–1745)
Francis Josias, Duke of Saxe-Coburg-Saalfeld (1745–1764), co-Regent of Saxe-Weimar-Eisenach (1748–1755)
Ernest Frederick, Duke (1764–1800)
Francis, Duke (1800–1806)

Saxe-Gotha-Altenburg (complete list) –
Frederick II, Duke (1691–1732)
Frederick III, Duke of Saxe-Gotha-Altenburg (1732–1772), co-Regent of Saxe-Weimar-Eisenach (1748–1755))
Ernest II, Duke (1772–1804)

Saxe-Hildburghausen (complete list) –
Ernest, co-Duke of Saxe-Gotha-Altenburg (1675–1680), Duke of Saxe-Hildburghausen (1680–1715)
Ernest Frederick I, Duke (1715–1724)
Sophia Albertine of Erbach-Erbach, Regent (1724–1728)
Ernest Frederick II, Duke (1724–1745)
Caroline of Erbach-Fürstenau, Regent (1745–1748)
Ernest Frederick III, Duke (1745–1780)
Joseph Frederick, Regent (1780–1787)
Frederick, Duke of Saxe-Hildburghausen (1780–1826), of Saxe-Altenburg (1826–1834)

Saxe-Meiningen (complete list) –
Bernhard I, co-Duke of Saxe-Gotha-Altenburg (1675–1680), Duke of Saxe-Meiningen (1680–1706)
Ernst Ludwig I, Duke (1706–1724)
Ernst Ludwig II, Duke (1724–1729)
Friedrich II of Saxe-Gotha, co-Regent (1729–1733)
Karl Friedrich, Duke (1729–1743)
Friedrich Wilhelm, co-Regent (1729–1733), co-Duke (1743–1746)
Anthony Ulrich, Duke (1746–1763)
Charlotte Amalie of Hesse-Philippsthal, Regent (1763–1779)
Karl Wilhelm, Duke (1763–1782)
Georg I, Duke (1782–1803)

Saxe-Weimar (complete list) –
William Ernest, Duke of Saxe-Weimar (1683–1728), Regent of Saxe-Jena (1686–1690)
Ernest Augustus I, Duke of Saxe-Weimar (1707–1741), of Saxe-Weimar-Eisenach (1741–1748)

Saxe-Weimar-Eisenach (complete list) –
Ernest Augustus I, Duke of Saxe-Weimar (1707–1741), of Saxe-Weimar-Eisenach (1741–1748)
Frederick III, Duke of Saxe-Gotha-Altenburg (1732–1772), co-Regent of Saxe-Weimar-Eisenach (1748–1755)
Francis Josias, Duke of Saxe-Coburg-Saalfeld (1745–1764), co-Regent of Saxe-Weimar-Eisenach (1748–1755)
Ernest Augustus II, Duke (1748–1758)
Anna Amalia of Brunswick-Wolfenbüttel, Regent (1758–1775)
Karl August, Duke (1758–1815), Grand Duke (1815–1828)

Schwarzburg-Rudolstadt (complete list) –
Albert Anton, Count (1646–1710)
Louis Frederick I, Prince (1710–1718)
Frederick Anton, Prince (1718–1744)
John Frederick, Prince (1744–1767)
Louis Günther II, Prince (1767–1790)
Frederick Charles, Prince (1790–1793)
Louis Frederick II, Prince (1793–1807)

Schwarzburg-Sondershausen (complete list) –
Anton Günther II, co-Count (1666–1697), co-Prince (1697–1716)
Christian William, co-Count (1666–1697), co-Prince (1697–1721)
Günther XLIII, Prince (1721–1740)
Henry XXXV, Prince (1740–1758)
Christian Günther III, Prince (1758–1794)
, Prince (1794–1835)

County of Stolberg (de:complete list) –
Christoph Ludwig I, Count (1634–1704)

Stolberg-Rossla (de:complete list) –
, Count (1706–1739)
, Count (1739–1768)
Heinrich Friedrich Christian zu Stolberg-Roßla, Count (1768–1806)

Stolberg-Stolberg (de:complete list) –
, Count (1706–1738)
Christian Günther zu Stolberg-Stolberg, Count (1738–1765)
Karl Ludwig zu Stolberg-Stolberg, Count (1765–1806)

Stolberg-Wernigerode (complete list) –
Ernest, Count (1672–1710)
Christian Ernest, Count (1710–1771)
Henry Ernest, Count (1771–1778)
Christian Frederick, Count (1778–1807)

Swabian

Prince-Bishopric of Augsburg (complete list) –
Alexander Sigismund von der Pfalz-Neuburg, Prince-bishop (1690–1737)
Johann Franz Schenk von Stauffenberg, Prince-bishop (1737–1740)
Joseph Ignaz Philipp von Hessen-Darmstadt, Prince-bishop (1740–1768)
Clemens Wenceslaus of Saxony, Prince-bishop (1768–1803)

Margraviate of Baden-Baden (complete list) –
Louis William the Turkish, Margrave (1677–1707)
Sibylle of Saxe-Lauenburg, Regent (1707–1727)
Louis George the Hunter, Margrave (1707–1761)
August George, Margrave (1761–1771)
then inherited by Charles Frederick to unite Baden

Margraviate of Baden-Durlach/ Margraviate of Baden (complete list) –
Frederick VII Magnus, Margrave (1677–1709)
Charles III William, Margrave (1709–1738)
Magdalena Wilhelmine of Württemberg, Regent (1738–1742)
Charles August of Baden-Durlach, Regent (1738–1746)
Charles Frederick, Margrave of Baden-Durlach (1746–1771), of Baden (1771–1803), Elector (1803–1806), Grand Duke (1806–1811)

Prince-Bishopric of Constance (complete list) –
Marquard Rudolf von Rodt, Prince-bishop (1689–1704)
Johann Franz Schenk von Stauffenberg, Prince-bishop (1704–1740)
Hugo Damian von Schönborn, Prince-bishop (1740–1743)
, Prince-bishop (1743–1750)
, Prince-bishop (1750–1775)
, Prince-bishop (1775–1799)
Karl Theodor Anton Maria von Dalberg, Prince-bishop (1799–1803)

Prince-Provostry of Ellwangen (complete list) –
Francis Louis, Prince-provost (1694–1732)
Franz Georg von Schönborn, Prince-provost (1732–1756)
, Prince-provost (1756–1787)
Clemens Wenceslaus, Prince-provost (1787–1803)

Gutenzell Abbey (de:complete list) –
Maria Victoria Hochwind, Princess-abbess (1696–1718)
Maria Bernarda von Donnersberg, Princess-abbess (1718–1747)
Maria Franziska von Gall, Princess-abbess (1747–1759)
Maria Alexandra Zimmermann, Princess-abbess (1759–1776)
Maria Justina von Erolzheim, Princess-abbess (1776–1803)

Hohenzollern-Hechingen (complete list) –
Friedrich Wilhelm, Prince (1671–1735)
Friedrich Ludwig, Prince (1735–1750)
Josef Friedrich Wilhelm, Prince (1750–1798)
Hermann, Prince (1798–1810)

Hohenzollern-Sigmaringen (complete list) –
Meinrad II, Prince (1689–1715)
Joseph Friedrich Ernst, Prince (1715–1769)
Karl Friedrich, Prince (1769–1785)
Anton Aloys, Prince (1785–1831)

Princely Abbey of Kempten (complete list) –
, Prince-abbot (1678–1728)
, Prince-abbot (1728–1747)
, Prince-abbot (1747–1760)
, Prince-abbot (1760–1785)
, Prince-abbot (1785–1793)
, Prince-abbot (1793–1803)

Königsegg-Aulendorf (complete list) –
Francis Maximilian, Count (1692–1710)
Charles Siegfried, Count (1710–1765)
Herman Frederick, Count (1765–1786)
Ernest, Count (1786–1803)

Königsegg-Rothenfels (complete list) –
Sigmund William, Count (1694–1709)
Albert, Count (1709–1736)
Charles Ferdinand, Count (1736–1759)
Francis Hugh, Count (1759–1771)
Francis Fidelis Anthony, Count (1771–1804)

Lindau Abbey (de:complete list) –
Maria Magdalena von Hallwyl, Princess-abbess (1689–1720)
Maria Franzisca Hundbiss von Waltrams, Princess-abbess (1720–1730)
, Princess-abbess (1730–1743)
, Princess-abbess (1743–1757)
, Princess-abbess (1757–1771)
Maria Josepha Agatha von Ulm-Langenrhein, Princess-abbess (1771–1781)
, Princess-abbess (1782–1796)
Maria Anna Franziska Susanna Clara Ferdinanda von Ulm-Langenrhein, Princess-abbess (1797–1800)

Principality of Mindelheim (complete list) –
John Churchill Prince (1705–1714)

Oettingen-Wallerstein (complete list) –
Wolfgang IV, Count (1692–1708)
Franz Ignaz, Count (1708–1728)
Anton Karl, Count (1728–1738)
Johann Karl Friedrich, Count (1738–1744)
Maximilian Ignaz Philipp, Count (1744–1745)
Philipp Karl, Count (1745–1766)
Kraft Ernst, Count (1766–1774), Prince (1774–1802)

Stadion (complete list) –
John Philip, Lord (1666–1686), Baron (1686–1705), Count (1705–1741)

Stadion-Thannhausen (complete list) –
Hugo Philip, Count (1741–1785)
John George Joseph Nepomuk, Count (1785–1806)

Stadion-Warthausen (complete list) –
Anthony Henry Frederick, Count (1741–1768)
Francis Conrad, Count (1768–1787)
Johann Philipp, Count (1787–1806)

Weingarten Abbey (complete list) –
Sebastian Hyller, Prince-abbot (1697–1730)
Alfons II Jobst, Prince-abbot (1730–1738)
Placidus Renz, Prince-abbot (1738–1745)
Domenicus II Schnitzer, Prince-abbot (1746–1784)
Anselm Ritter, Prince-abbot (1784–1803)

Duchy of Württemberg (complete list) –
Eberhard Louis, Duke of Württemberg, Duke (1677–1733)
Charles Alexander, Duke of Württemberg, Duke (1733–1737)
Frederick Achilles, Duke of Württemberg-Neuenstadt, Duke (1617–1631)
Frederick, Duke of Württemberg-Neuenstadt, Duke (1649–1682)
Frederick Charles, Duke of Württemberg-Winnental, Duke (1677–1698)
Frederick Augustus, Duke of Württemberg-Neuenstadt, Duke (1682–1716)
Carl Rudolf, Duke of Württemberg-Neuenstadt, Duke (1716–1742)
Charles Eugene, Duke of Württemberg, Duke (1737–1793)
Louis Eugene, Duke of Württemberg, Duke (1793–1795 )
Frederick II Eugene, Duke of Württemberg, Duke (1795–1797)
Frederick I, Duke (1797–1803), Elector (1803–1805), King (1805–1816)

Swiss Confederacy

Italy

Holy Roman Empire in Italy

Republic of Genoa (complete list) –
Girolamo De Mari, Doge (1699–1701)
Federico De Franchi Toso, Doge (1701–1703)
Antonio Grimaldi, Doge (1703–1705)
Stefano Onorato Ferretti, Doge (1705–1707)
Domenico Maria De Mari, Doge (1707–1709)
Vincenzo Durazzo, Doge (1709–1711)
Francesco Maria Imperiale, Doge (1711–1713)
Giovanni Antonio Giustiniani, Doge (1713–1715)
Lorenzo Centurione, Doge (1715–1717)
Benedetto Viale, Doge (1717–1719)
Ambrogio Imperiale, Doge (1719–1721)
Cesare De Franchi Toso, Doge (1721–1723)
Domenico Negrone, Doge (1723–1725)
Gerolamo Veneroso, Doge (1726–1728)
Luca Grimaldi, Doge (1728–1730)
Francesco Maria Balbi, Doge (1730–1732)
Domenico Maria Spinola, Doge (1732–1734)
Stefano Durazzo, Doge (1734–1736)
Nicolò Cattaneo Della Volta, Doge (1736–1738)
Costantino Balbi, Doge (1738–1740)
Nicolò Spinola, Doge (1740–1742)
Domenico Canevaro, Doge (1742–1744)
Lorenzo De Mari, Doge (1744–1746)
Giovanni Francesco II Brignole Sale, Doge (1746–1748)
Cesare Cattaneo Della Volta, Doge (1748–1750)
Agostino Viale, Doge (1750–1752)
Stefano Lomellini, Doge (1752)
Giovanni Battista Grimaldi, Doge (1752–1754)
Gian Giacomo Veneroso, Doge (1754–1756)
Giovanni Giacomo Grimaldi, Doge (1756–1758)
Matteo Franzoni, Doge (1758–1760)
Agostino Lomellini, Doge (1760–1762)
Rodolfo Emilio Brignole Sale, Doge (1762–1764)
Francesco Maria Della Rovere, Doge (1765–1767)
Marcello Durazzo, Doge (1767–1769)
Giovanni Battista Negrone, Doge (1769–1771)
Giovanni Battista Cambiaso, Doge (1771–1773)
Ferdinando Spinola, Doge (1773–1775)
Pier Francesco Grimaldi, Doge (1775–1777)
Brizio Giustiniani, Doge (1777–1779)
Giuseppe Lomellini, Doge (1779–1781)
Giacomo Maria Brignole, Doge (1781–1783)
Marco Antonio Gentile, Doge (1783–1785)
Giovanni Battista Ayroli, Doge (1785–1787)
Gian Carlo Pallavicino, Doge (1787–1789)
Raffaele Agostino De Ferrari, Doge (1789–1791)
Alerame Maria Pallavicini, Doge (1791–1793)
Michelangelo Cambiaso, Doge (1793–1795)
Giuseppe Maria Doria, Doge (1795–1797)

Duchy of Milan (complete list) –
Philip IV, Duke (1700–1714)
Charles II, Duke (1714–1740)
Maria Theresa, Duchess (1740–1780)
Joseph I, Duke (1780–1790)
Leopold I, Duke (1790–1792)
Francis III, Duke (1792–1796)

Duchy of Modena (complete list) –
Rinaldo, Duke (1695–1737)
Francesco III, Duke (1737–1780)
Ercole III, Duke (1780–1796)

Principality of Orange (complete list) –
William III, Prince (1650–1702)

Papal States (complete list) –
Innocent XII, Pope (1691–1700)
Clement XI, Pope (1700–1721)
Innocent XIII, Pope (1721–1724)
Benedict XIII, Pope (1724–1730)
Clement XII, Pope (1730–1740)
Benedict XIV, Pope (1740–1758)
Clement XIII, Pope (1758–1769)
Clement XIV, Pope (1769–1774)
Pius VI, Pope (1775–1799)
Pius VII, Pope (1800–1823)

Duchy of Savoy (complete list) –
Victor Amadeus II, Duke (1675–1730)
Charles Emmanuel III, Duke (1730–1773)
Victor Amadeus III, Duke (1773–1792)

Kingdom of Sardinia (complete list) –
Victor Amadeus II, King (1720–1730)
Charles Emmanuel III, King (1730–1773)
Victor Amadeus III, King (1773–1796)
Charles Emmanuel IV, King (1796–1802)

References

Bibliography

18th century
 
-
18th century in the Holy Roman Empire